Once Upon a Time or Once Upon a Time... This Morning ( or Kalla khrung nueng... muea chao nee) is a 1995 Thai drama film directed by Bhandit Rittakol. The film was selected as the Thai entry for the Best Foreign Language Film at the 68th Academy Awards, but was not accepted as a nominee.

Cast
 Ronnarong Buranat
 Martang Jantranee
 Santisuk Promsiri
 Chintara Sukapatana
 Charlie Trairat

See also
 List of submissions to the 68th Academy Awards for Best Foreign Language Film
 List of Thai submissions for the Academy Award for Best Foreign Language Film

References

External links
 

1995 films
1995 drama films
Five Star Production films
Thai drama films
Thai-language films
Best Picture Suphannahong National Film Award winners
Thai national heritage films

Films directed by Bhandit Rittakol